Sultan Mohamed Sultan Farah was the sultan for the Arap clan, part of the wider Isaaq clan family and the first traditional leader to join the Somali National Movement. An influential figure who commanded the 10th division of the SNM and lead the demobilization process of the organisation in Somaliland. The Arap's decision to demobilise applied pressure on other clans to follow suit. playing an instrumental role in the Somaliland peace process.

Demobilisation Initiatives 1993 
The Somaliland government sought unify SNM armed factions to ensure demobilisation and reintegration of ex-combatants into society.

In early 1994, a well-staged ceremony was held in the Hargeysa football stadium, whereby Somaliland which clans publicly hand over their weapons to the government led by Muhammad Haji Ibrahim Egal.

See also 

 Arap
 Sheikh San'ani Brigade
 Somali National Movement
Somaliland Peace Process
 Politics of Somaliland

References 

Somali sultans
Somalian Muslims
20th-century Somalian people
1920s births
2003 deaths